John Gedmark is an American entrepreneur, startup founder, and aerospace engineer. He is the co-founder and CEO of Astranis, and was the Founding Executive Director of the Commercial Spaceflight Federation.

Gedmark started Astranis with co-founder Ryan McLinko to build next-generation internet satellites. Astranis has raised over $350 million from investors including Andreessen Horowitz and Venrock. The company successfully launched a test satellite into space in 2018, and announced its first commercial contract in early 2019, a dedicated satellite for the State of Alaska to boost capacity to the state and bring satellite internet connectivity to underserved communities.

Early life 
Gedmark was born and raised in Kentucky. He graduated from Purdue’s undergraduate Aerospace Engineering program in 2003, and served as the President of his local Students for the Development and Exploration of Space (SEDS) chapter. Gedmark earned his Master of Science in Aerospace Engineering at Stanford University. While at Stanford, Gedmark co-founded the Roosevelt Institute, a public policy think tank for students, which grew to over 80 university campuses nationwide by 2012. 

After earning his master’s degree, Gedmark worked at the X Prize Foundation and brought together industry leaders Elon Musk, Peter Diamandis, John Carmack, Alex Tai, and others to promote industry collaboration, leading to the formation of the Commercial Spaceflight Federation (then-named the Personal Spaceflight Federation). Gedmark was featured in Christian Davenport’s book Space Barons for this work.

Commercial Spaceflight Federation 
After a meeting of the commercial spaceflight industry group at SpaceX headquarters, the group decided that the industry needed a representative in Washington, D.C. and an official organization. Gedmark registered what was then named the Personal Spaceflight Federation as a non-profit dedicated to “resolving the regulatory, legal, political and broad strategic challenges the personal spaceflight industry faces moving forward.”

Over the next five years, Gedmark served as the Federation’s Executive Director and represented the shared interests of its members like SpaceX, Virgin Galactic, Blue Origin, and others in Washington D.C. The organization rebranded to become the Commercial Spaceflight Federation in 2009.

Astranis 

In 2015, Gedmark and Ryan McLinko founded Astranis, with Gedmark as chief executive officer and McLinko as chief technical officer. The company was founded to get the next four billion people online by building smaller, cheaper satellites for broadband internet, and is headquartered in San Francisco, California.

Astranis was admitted into the Y Combinator startup accelerator’s Winter 2016 cohort. In early 2018, Astranis announced the successful launch and operation of its first demonstration satellite, a 3U cubesat with a software-defined radio payload, and a $18 million Series A fundraising round from Andreessen Horowitz. In 2019, Astranis announced its first customer contract, a deal worth tens of millions of dollars to "more than triple the amount of satellite capacity available to Alaskans." In 2020, Astranis raised a Series B financing round of $90 million, and in 2021, Astranis raised a $250 million Series C financing round.

References 

American chief executives
American aerospace engineers
Purdue University School of Aeronautics and Astronautics alumni
Stanford University School of Engineering alumni
American company founders
Year of birth missing (living people)
Living people